Puig Cerverís is a mountain of Catalonia, Spain. Located in the Pyrenees, it has an elevation of 2,208 metres above sea level.

See also
Mountains of Catalonia

References

Mountains of Catalonia
Mountains of the Pyrenees